LiquidFeedback is free software for political opinion formation and decision making, combining aspects of representative and direct democracy. Its most important feature is the implementation of a delegated voting system ("liquid democracy") which is to establish a new form of political representation and participation that takes into account the knowledge disparity of its participants. The software offers much promise but also faces many threats.

Description 
LiquidFeedback helps groups (such as societies or organizations, political or not) make decisions, without the limitations of a traditional Internet forum. 
It aims to create an accurate representation of the opinions held by the members of the group without them being distorted by social hierarchies and knowledge disparities. Each individual is encouraged to further their own initiatives within the limitations set by the operators.

The proxy voting feature creates power structures similar to representative democracy, even though delegations can be withdrawn at any time. This is necessary to produce results that reflect the mood of the majority, even when they don't find the time to participate in person, in order to avoid the domination of the extroverts, which is the problem that regularly arises with grassroots democracy.

Liquid Democracy can be seen as going hand in hand with LiquidFeedback. Liquid Democracy focuses on the idea of voting taking place using technology while LiquidFeedback is a system trying to bring the idea into fruition. The online platform gives the user the power to vote on affairs themselves. Additionally, people are given the option to delegate their vote to a group or select person if they feel as if the individuals or individual is better suited to make the decision. The purpose of this is to allow the most knowledgeable on a specific subject to make the decision. Because not everyone is invested in political issues evenly, the ability to delegate a person's vote to someone more knowledgeable can make the voter feel secure.

LiquidFeedback is not only used to give users the ability to vote rather it allows them to make propositions on certain issues. The proposed initiatives can be tweaked by users, if desired, to the satisfaction of others. LiquidFeedback was originally designed for people to ponder different subjects but it has evolved from that. The concept of Liquid Democracy has made it so people can fight for what they want using the software of LiquidFeedback. Within LiquidFeedback's "Polling Mode", users have the ability to see whether or not the edits they made to a proposed bill are agreed upon or not by the general community. The platform allows users to interact with each other to shape bills into the best versions they can be. These proposals have the ability to become law through governmental procedures used within the software. Discussions take place in order to make sure the community agrees with the changes in order to make sure people will vote in favor of the topic.

Usage 
The proposition development process can be summarized as follows: 
 user driven, self organized process (collective moderation, no request commission necessary)
 every member can start an initiative
 quantified constructive feedback (support, suggestions, implementation assessment)
 initiators decide about implementation
 no fundamental opposition within an initiative
 every member can start an alternative initiative
 alternative initiatives define the issue and are voted upon together using Cloneproof Schwartz Sequential Dropping (Schulze Method)

To allow different values for timings and supporter quorums, and to allow the possibility of supermajority requirements for certain decisions, LiquidFeedback allows its users to have so-called "policies" for different kinds of decisions. The results can be used for information, suggestion, directive, or as binding decisions depending on the organizational needs and the national legislation.

History 
LiquidFeedback was co-written by Andreas Nitsche, Jan Behrens, Axel Kistner and Bjoern Swierczek.  The software incorporates the concepts of Liquid Democracy, Proposition development process, Preferential voting or the Schulze method, and Interactive Democracy into the operation of the software.  The software was first published in October 2009 by Public Software Group e. V. after being suggested by some members of Germany's Pirate Party unsatisfied with conventional means of political opinion formation. Despite this affiliation, its developers are fully independent from the users of the software and they allow the software's usage by other parties and organizations. The first stable version of its back end was released in April 2010.

The German Pirate Party designed LiquidFeedback in order to be able to participate in Liquid Democracy. The technology used has provided direction for how the party makes decisions on issues. Feedback from users allows party officials to know what the people want while also allowing for people's opinions. It can be used to make sure everyone in the party has a vote and that their voice is heard. Some people may not be quite as passionate about an issue than others which is accounted for by the ability to delegate votes. The countries mentioned in the paragraph above all have similar forms of Liquid Democracy that stem from the software of LiquidFeedback. 

The software has been successfully used for the preparation of several national conventions by the Pirate Parties of Germany, Austria, Italy, Switzerland and Brazil. It is also used by Slow Food Germany and some local branches of the Five Star Movement in Italy.

Protection of minorities
LiquidFeedback provides several mechanisms to protect minorities. Even though decisions are finally made by majorities (see also: Majority rule), the software allows

 minorities and even individuals to present their point of views,
 minorities of a certain size to put their proposals to the vote.

In this context, all text contributions are sorted in a way that a proportional representation of the minorities is assured. Depending on the integration of the software, this may empower minorities to put their viewpoints to discussion directly at the top level of an organization without the necessity to go through a hierarchy.

Technical specifications
The front end is written in Lua while the back end is written in PL/pgSQL. Both parts are released under the MIT License. There is also an API available which allows external applications to add additional features to the program.

Criticism 
The implementation of LiquidFeedback led to heated discussion among the members of the German Pirate Party: Defenders of data protection criticized the software's ability to match each statement and vote to its individual author, although that was the intention. Because the software only allows for voting by a recorded vote, it is easily possible to identify the participants' political opinions by their voting behaviour. This improves the transparency of the political process as it makes any special interest openly visible.

By allowing communities to discuss bills in hope for change, political preferences can emerge at times. People may want to keep such information close to them and, in turn, can become deterred from the idea of voting using LiquidFeedback's software. The ability to give votes to other users comes with a huge problem when it comes to the integrity of the election. If someone were to give their vote to another user not because they think that they are more knowledgeable on a subject but because they received some sort of benefit, the election would lose purity. Due to the uncertainty behind the reasons people actually give their vote to another user, rigging of an election can never be known. Even though votes are transparent, it is difficult to prevent corrupt people from becoming super-voters who hold much power. The transparency of the voting also deters certain citizens from wanting to vote. Some citizens want their political decisions to remain private as they fear other people may judge them based on their decision. Normal elections allow citizens to keep their political preferences private whereas LiquidFeedback demonstrates transparency when it comes to this in order to make sure users are who they say they are.

Some have argued that the ability to delegate votes could create and enforce power structures, even though delegations can be withdrawn at any time. The authors of the program later introduced an option for the organisation to activate automatic removal of inactive users.

Features of LiquidFeedback 

LiquidFeedback is focused on the future of voting. The software is designed to promote civic engagement towards those that may be hesitant to have their voice heard. By allowing people to vote and make decisions electronically, LiquidFeedback provides a convenience factor when it comes to voting. In addition, those that may feel shy about voicing their opinions can speak freely on the platform without having to be worried about what others think of them. The Pirate Party has also been using the system of LiquidFeedback since 2010 and it has been extremely reliable thus far. The reliability stems from the decision-making process used within LiquidFeedback. It successfully determines what voters want by using the "Schulze mathematical method", which takes into account how people perceive a situation rather than a simple yes or no. This provides a more accurate depiction of how people see certain situations.

The ability to transfer votes to more knowledgeable users can stand out as a benefit because everyone wants what is best for their community. Parties using LiquidFeedback have demonstrated that vote delegation is a solution to creating a better society. Only LiquidFeedback allows votes to be transferred without the need for an extreme reason. The ability to transfer votes without an excuse needed benefits all by making sure the decision needed by society is not hindered by those that do not know everything about a proposal.

2018–present 
On 27 July 2018 the association for Interactive Democracy released its first prototype of Blockchain and LiquidFeedback together.  The software is called LiquidFeedback Blockchain and it focuses completely on the democratic sector rather than the traditional things Blockchain would. LiquidFeedback Blockchain has the ability to not only focus on democracy but it also has multiple real-world applications. Using this software, companies have the ability to agree on contracts enabling a faster and more efficient solution than pen and paper. Blockchain helps secure the original software of LiquidFeedback, in turn, making it safer to verify users due to blockchain's use of decentralized networks. As of lately LiquidFeedback also focuses on more than voting. According to the LiquidFeedback website the company is trying to tailor the software to different corporations. The for profit company selling the software of LiquidFeedback is trying to shift its focus from just a software for voting to a software that can be used in different businesses. They are doing this in hopes to broaden the number of people willing to use their content. The multi-purposeful tool allows users to tailor the software to whatever need they may have in a business setting.

See also 
 Liquid democracy
 Schulze method
 German Pirate Party
 E-democracy
 Radical transparency
 Participatory culture and technology
 Participatory democracy
 Collaborative e-democracy
Civic engagement
Supermajority
Proxy Voting
Direct Democracy
Grassroot Democracy
Blockchain

References

External links 
 
 Public Software Group
 CNN: Fed up with politics?... - The "Liquid Feedback" generation
 Spiegel Magazine: Web Platform Makes Professor Most Powerful Pirate
 The Economist: The ayes have it
 The New York Times: Direct Democracy, 2.0
 The New York Times: New Politics, Ahoy!
 "David Meyer talks about the Piratenpartei Deutschland (Pirate Party Germany)" YouTube interview with David Meyer, a freelance reporter in Germany that writes for ZDNet. Mark Strassman from Etopia News conducted the interview on 15 May 2012.  Coverage of the Liquid Feedback software occurs during duration 8:53-14:56.  Retrieved 23 December 2012.

Direct democracy
Free software programmed in Lua (programming language)
Software using the MIT license
Voting
Open government
Political software